The 2012 Harrogate Borough Council election took place on 3 May 2012 to elect members of the Harrogate Borough District Council in North Yorkshire, England. This was on the same day as other 2012 United Kingdom local elections.

References

2012 English local elections
2012
2010s in North Yorkshire